This is a list of members of the South Australian Legislative Council from 1970 to 1973.

 LCL MLC Colin Rowe died on 2 August 1970. Keith Russack was elected to fill the vacancy on 12 September.
 LCL MLC Sir Norman Jude resigned on 17 June 1971. Martin Cameron was elected to fill the vacancy on 3 July.

References
Parliament of South Australia — Statistical Record of the Legislature

Members of South Australian parliaments by term
20th-century Australian politicians